The Journal of Pentecostal Theology is a peer-reviewed academic journal covering theological research from a Pentecostal perspective. It was established at the Pentecostal Theological Seminary and is maintained by the Center for Pentecostal Theology. The editors-in-chief are Lee Roy Martin and John Christopher Thomas (Pentecostal Theological Seminary).

History 
The journal was founded by editors-in-chief John Christopher Thomas, Rickie D. Moore, and Steven Jack Land in 1992. Previously published by SAGE Publications, it has moved to Brill Publishers in July 2007.

Abstracting and indexing 
The journal is abstracted and indexed by the ATLA Religion Database and Scopus.

References

External links 
 

Brill Publishers academic journals
Publications established in 1992
English-language journals
Biannual journals
Protestant studies journals